Grace Greenwood Ames (born Brooklyn, January 15, 1905 – died New York City, July 21, 1979) was an American artist and social realism muralist. She worked in Mexico on murals alongside historical artists.

When she married, rather than dropping her maiden name she added her husband's surname Ames on to the end of her name, and called herself variously 'Grace Greenwood', 'Grace Ames', or (as she has become known) 'Grace Greenwood Ames'. Later in life she became known as 'Grace Crampton'.

Biography 
Grace Greenwood was born in Brooklyn, New York on January 15, 1905 to Walter Greenwood and Kathryn Boyland. Her father was a painter and her younger sister Marion Greenwood was also an artist. Ames studied at Art Students League of New York, alongside her sister. She went on to study art in Italy in the 1920s. In 1929, both of the Greenwood sisters participated in the famed Bohemian event, the Maverick Festival (1915–1931) at the Maverick Art Colony in Woodstock, New York.

Between 1933 to 1936, Ames worked on five murals with her sister Marion, serving as her painting assistant while in Mexico. One of the murals was at the Aberlardo L. Rodríguez market in the historic center of Mexico City and the Museo Regional Michoacano, commissioned by the Universidad Michoacana de San Nicolás de Hidalgo in Morelia, Mexico. Grace Ames painted murals together with Diego Rivera, José Clemente Orozco, David Alfaro Siqueiros, Pablo O'Higgins, Leopoldo Méndez, and other well-known Mexican "muralista".

Her work includes the oil on canvas murals titled Progress of Power in the Lexington, Tennessee post office, commissioned by the Treasury Section of Fine Arts, and completed in 1940.

Later in life Ames eventually decided not to follow an art career, instead she moved to Woodstock, New York and went by the name Grace Crampton.

Ames work is found in public art collections including the National Gallery of Art, amongst others.

Exhibitions 
 1940 – PM Competition: The Artist as Reporter, Museum of Modern Art (MoMA), New York City, New York

References

External links 
 Oral history interview with Grace Greenwood, 1965 Jan 29 from Archives of American Art, Smithsonian Institution

20th-century American painters
Mexican muralists
Section of Painting and Sculpture artists
1905 births
1979 deaths
Artists from Brooklyn
Painters from New York City
American muralists
American women painters
20th-century American women artists
Women muralists
Treasury Relief Art Project artists
Art Students League of New York alumni
People from Woodstock, New York
American expatriates in Mexico